The Marconi class was a class of six submarines built for the Royal Italian Navy. The submarines were all launched between 1939 and 1940, and all but one, were lost in the Atlantic during the Second World War.

Class members

Guglielmo Marconi
Guglielmo Marconi (pennant number MN) was launched 27 July 1939 and completed on 2 February 1940. On its first wartime patrol in the Mediterranean Sea, Marconi torpedoed the Royal Navy destroyer  on 8 July 1940. Marconi sailed on 6 September 1940 and passed the Strait of Gibraltar on 11 September for an Atlantic patrol to Bordeaux on 29 September. En route Marconi sank the neutral Spanish fishing boat Almirante Jose de Carranza. Marconi sank one ship on its first BETASOM patrol from Bordeaux. Marconi was lost to unknown causes sometime after 28 October 1941 on its fifth BETASOM patrol.

Leonardo da Vinci
 (pennant number LV) was launched 16 September 1939. da Vinci sailed on 22 September 1940 and passed the Strait of Gibraltar on 27 September for an Atlantic patrol to Bordeaux on 31 October. After unsuccessful patrols from 21 December to 20 January 1941 and from 4 April to 4 May, da Vinci sank one ship on its third BETASOM patrol. After another unsuccessful patrol from 15 August to 24 September, da Vinci sank two ships during Operation Neuland and four ships on the following patrol. After being modified to carry a midget submarine, da Vinci sailed without the midget submarine and sank four ships. Sailing again without the midget submarine, da Vinci sank six ships on its last patrol. While attempting to return to Bordeaux, da Vinci was sunk on 23 May 1943 by the escorts of convoy KMF 15. There were no survivors. Leonardo da Vinci was the top scoring non-German submarine of the entire war.

Michele Bianchi
 (pennant number BH) was launched 3 December 1939. Its first war patrol was in the Mediterranean Sea from 15 August to 3 September 1940. Bianchi sailed on 27 October 1940 and reached the Strait of Gibraltar on 3 November. The attempted transit to the Atlantic was detected by Royal Navy forces; and Bianchi took refuge in the neutral port of Tangier. Bianchi sailed from Tangier on 12 November and reached Bordeaux on 18 December 1940. Bianchi sank three ships on its first BETASOM patrol from Bordeaux; but the next patrol from 30 April to 30 May 1941 was unsuccessful.

Luigi Torelli
Torelli (pennant number TI) was launched 6 January 1940. After one short war patrol in the Mediterranean, Torelli sailed on 31 August 1940 and passed the Strait of Gibraltar on 8 September for an Atlantic patrol to Bordeaux on 5 October. Torelli sank four ships on its first BETASOM patrol; and, after an unsuccessful second patrol, sank one ship on a third patrol. After another unsuccessful patrol, Torelli assisted the three s on a rescue mission of 254 sailors from the sunken  in December 1941.

Torelli sank two ships during Operation Neuland. Torelli again sailed from Bordeaux on 2 June 1942, but was twice damaged by aircraft and sought refuge in the neutral Spanish ports of Avilés and Santander, Cantabria before returning to Bordeaux on 15 July. After an extensive refit, Torelli was again damaged at sea by aircraft on 16 March 1943 and returned to Bordeaux on 3 April. Torelli was then selected for conversion to a "transport submarine" in order to exchange rare or irreplaceable trade goods with Japan. Cargo capacity of 160 tons reduced reserve buoyancy from 20–25% to 3.5–6%; and armament was reduced to defensive machine guns. Torelli sailed as a transport submarine on 18 June 1943 and reached Penang on 27 August 1943.

UIT-25
Torelli was commissioned into the German Kriegsmarine as UIT-25 when Italy capitulated to the Allies in September 1943.

I-504
UIT-25 was taken over by the Imperial Japanese Navy and became I-504 when Germany surrendered in May 1945. I-504 shot down a B-25 Mitchell bomber while under Japanese flag near the very end of the war in the Pacific, allegedly the last success of a Japanese naval vessel in that conflict. It was found at Kobe when Japan surrendered and scuttled by the United States Navy in Kii Suido.

Alessandro Malaspina
 (pennant number MP) was launched 18 February 1940 and completed on 20 June 1940. Its first patrol was through the Strait of Gibraltar on 3 August for an Atlantic patrol. Malaspina sank one ship before reaching Bordeaux on 4 September. Admiral Karl Dönitz visited Malaspina on 30 September to welcome Regia Marina sailors to the German base. The first BETASOM patrols from 9 October to 9 November 1940, from 5 January to 28 February 1941 were unsuccessful; but during a third patrol Malaspina damaged the British liner Lycaon on 3 May 1941. Malaspina then sank two ships on the next patrol. Malaspina sailed from Bordeaux on 7 September 1941; and is believed to have been sunk on 10 September by No. 10 Squadron RAAF Short Sunderland "U".

Maggiore Baracca
 (pennant number BC) was launched 21 April 1940 and completed on 10 July 1940. Its first patrol was through the Strait of Gibraltar on 7 September for an Atlantic patrol. Baracca sank one ship before reaching Bordeaux on 6 October. Baracca sank one ship on its first BETASOM patrol from Bordeaux, but last four patrols were unsuccessful. Thirty-two members of the submarine crew survived the sinking.

See also
 Italian submarines of World War II

Notes

References
 Marconi class at regiamarina.net
 Bagnasco, Erminio (1977) Submarines of World War Two London, Cassell & Co, 
 Brice, Martin (1981) Axis Blockade Runners of World War II Annapolis, MD, Naval Institute Press, 
 Kafka, Roger & Pepperburg, Roy L. (1946) Warships of the World Cornell Maritime Press 
 Taylor, J.C. (1966) German Warships of World War II Doubleday & Company
 Willmott, H.P. (2009) The Last Century of Sea Power: From Port Arthur to Chanak, 1894-1922 Indiana University Press,

External links
 Guglielmo Marconi (1939) Marina Militare website

 
Submarine classes
 Marconi